The 1931 Massachusetts State Aggies football team represented Massachusetts State College in the 1931 college football season. The team was coached by Mel Taube and played its home games at Alumni Field in Amherst, Massachusetts. The 1931 season was the team's first as Mass State, following the school's name change in March of that year. Mass State enjoyed their most lopsided win in the history of the program on November 14 when they defeated  by the score of 77–0; this record still stands today as the team's largest margin of victory in a game. Mass State finished the season with a record of 7–1–1.

Schedule

References

Massachusetts State
UMass Minutemen football seasons
Massachusetts State Aggies football